Ashuluk is a rural locality (a settlement) in Tambovsky Selsoviet, Kharabalinsky District, Astrakhan Oblast, Russia. The population was 1,678 as of 2010. There are 3 streets.

Geography 
Ashuluk is located 18 km southeast of Kharabali (the district's administrative centre) by road. Tambovka is the nearest rural locality.

References 

Rural localities in Kharabalinsky District